Airtel Digital TV is an Indian Satellite television service provider owned and operated by Bharti Airtel. It is the second largest DTH operator in India. Its satellite service, launched in October 2008, transmits digital satellite television and audio to households in India. As of 30 March 2015, it has a total subscriber base of 10.07 million.

Products
On 4 May 2010, Airtel digital TV announced the launch of its HD+ record ever. On 24 May 2011, Airtel announced that its digital TV HD and HD-DVR boxes are software-enabled to view standard-definition (SD) content up-scaled to 1080i HD.

Technical information 
Airtel Digital TV's standard-definition broadcasts are in MPEG-4 with Interactive Service and 7-day Electronic Programmed Guide. A universal remote is included in the package that can, over IR frequencies, control both the TV and the DTH box. Airtel Digital TV HD provides channels of resolution 1080p pixel with a 16:9 aspect ratio. The set-top box is compatible with 7.1 Channel Dolby digital Plus surround sound and is the first HD set-top box in India to be compliant with the standard.

Services
Airtel Digital TV provides on-demand services on connected boxes that includes a catalog of movies, TV series and other programmed across English and various Indian languages.

References

External links 
 

Television networks in India
Direct broadcast satellite services
Digital television
High-definition television
Mass media companies based in Delhi
Indian companies established in 2008
Mass media companies established in 2008
Bharti Airtel
Indian brands
Warburg Pincus companies
2008 establishments in Delhi